John Gilbert is a film editor who works primarily in New Zealand. Gilbert has edited 17 feature films as well as television shows and short films. He won the Academy Award for Best Film Editing and the BAFTA Award for Best Editing, among several honors, for Mel Gibson's war drama Hacksaw Ridge (2016). Gilbert had earlier received various accolades for his work on Peter Jackson's The Lord of the Rings: The Fellowship of the Ring (2001), including the Satellite Award for Best Editing and nominations for an Academy Award, a BAFTA Award and an ACE Eddie Award.

John Gilbert's first position in film was with Government filmmaking body The National Film Unit, in his native New Zealand. Gilbert was taking a break from history and anthropology studies at the time, but never returned to university, moving on to Television New Zealand, where he worked as an assistant editor and editor. Gilbert also spent time freelancing as a sound editor.

Gilbert's first credit as an editor on a full-length feature was for the film Crush (1992), which was invited to the Cannes Film Festival. Gilbert received a "Best Editing" award from the New Zealand Film and Television Awards for comedy drama film Via Satellite (1998). He received a New Zealand Screen Award for editing The World's Fastest Indian (2005) and reunited with Mel Gibson on the historical drama The Professor and the Madman.

Gilbert has been elected to membership in the American Cinema Editors.

Selected filmography (editor)

References

External links

Living people
American Cinema Editors
New Zealand film editors
Best Editing BAFTA Award winners
Best Film Editing Academy Award winners
Year of birth missing (living people)